Vly Creek is a river in Delaware County and Greene County in New York. It flows into Bush Kill by Fleischmanns, New York. It flows through Lake Switzerland.

References

Rivers of New York (state)
Rivers of Delaware County, New York
Tributaries of the East Branch Delaware River
Rivers of Greene County, New York